The Barzillai Weeks House is a historic house located at 313 High Street in the West Barnstable section of Barnstable, Massachusetts.

Description and history 
The -story Cape style house was built in 1799 by Barzillai Weeks. The house was the center of a local farm for over 150 years, most of them under the ownership of Weeks' descendants. The house has well-preserved Federal styling, most prominent in the five-pane transom window over the main entrance.

The house was listed on the National Register of Historic Places on March 13, 1987.

See also
National Register of Historic Places listings in Barnstable County, Massachusetts

References

Houses in Barnstable, Massachusetts
National Register of Historic Places in Barnstable, Massachusetts
Houses on the National Register of Historic Places in Barnstable County, Massachusetts
Houses completed in 1799